Harmony Heights is an unincorporated area in central Yadkin County, North Carolina, United States, located west of Yadkinville. It is located along Old US 421 (West Main Street), from the intersection of Booger Swamp Road westward about one-half mile.

Originally a thriving small community, the area was home to Harmony Heights Lumber Company, Harmony Heights Animal Hospital, Welborn Chevrolet, Jabe Joyner's Barber Shop, and an Esso gas station.

Yadkin Valley Telephone Membership Corp. moved here in the 1960s from downtown Yadkinville. In August 1980, YVTMC moved to its current location in Courtney and Duke Power moved into the site. Duke Power moved operations to Jonesville in the early 1990s and the property is now owned by the Yadkin Valley Economic Development District Inc.

Harmony Heights Animal Hospital moved in the 1990s to a new facility at 220 Pollywood Lane Yadkinville, the only business in current operation maintaining the original name of the community where it began.

Unincorporated communities in Yadkin County, North Carolina
Unincorporated communities in North Carolina